Lucas Arnold and Tomás Carbonell were the defending champions, but did not participate together this year.  Arnold partnered Martín García, losing in the first round.  Carbonell partnered Piet Norval, losing in the first round.

Michaël Llodra and Diego Nargiso won in the final 7–6(7–2), 7–6(7–3), against Alberto Martín and Fernando Vicente.

Seeds

Draw

Draw

External links
 Draw

Doubles